The Project 940 Lenok class (a type of salmon) (known in the West by its NATO reporting name India class) was a military submarine design of the Soviet Union.

The submarines of this class were designed to function as mother ships for two India-class deep-submergence rescue vehicles (DSRVs).

While India-class boats have been seen going to the aid of Russian submarines involved in incidents, they have also been observed working in support of Russian Spetsnaz operations. The boats had decompression chambers and medical facilities on board. Two vessels of this class were built for the Soviet Navy. Both were scrapped in the 2000s.

Units

External links

Russian and Soviet navy submarine classes
Deep-submergence rescue vehicles
Auxiliary depot ship classes
Auxiliary search and rescue ship classes
Auxiliary ships of the Soviet Navy